Gap or The Gap may refer to various openings, vacant spaces, lacks or pauses:

Natural features
 Gap (landform), a low point or opening between hills or mountains or in a ridge or mountain range
 Treefall gap, a spacing between large trees in a forest

Places
 Gap, Alberta, Canada
 Gap, Hautes-Alpes, France
 Gap, North Carolina, United States
 Gap, Pennsylvania, United States
 Garmisch-Partenkirchen, Germany, a license plate code GAP
 Great Allegheny Passage (GAP), a hiking/biking trail stretching from Pittsburgh, Pennsylvania, to Cumberland, Maryland

Organizations and businesses
 Air Philippines, ICAO designator GAP
 Future Azerbaijan Party, an Azerbaijani political party
 G Adventures, formerly Gap Adventures, the largest adventure travel company in Canada
 Gap Analysis Program, a federally coordinated program operated in conjunction with states and regions to assess the overall health of wildlife
 Gap Broadcasting Group, often capitalized as GAP
 Gap FC, a French football club
 Gap Inc., a chain of retail clothing stores
 Genocide Awareness Project, a movable anti-abortion display
 Global Animal Partnership, an animal welfare nonprofit 
 Government Accountability Project, a United States nonprofit organization
 Great Ape Project, an international organization advocating legal rights for great apes
 Group of Personal Friends, an armed guard of the Socialist Party of Chile 1970-1973
 Group for the Advancement of Psychiatry, an American psychiatric professional organization
 Grupo Aeroportuario del Pacífico, an airport operator holding group in Mexico
 Gruppi di Azione Patriottica (The Patriotic Action Groups), a communist WWII-era Partisan group, often referred to in Italian as "Gappisti"
  (Partisan Action Group), an Italian resistance group founded by Giangiacomo Feltrinelli
 Guyana Action Party/Rise Organise and Rebuild Guyana, a Guyana political party
 Southeastern Anatolia Project, a regional development project in Turkey
 The Great Atlantic & Pacific Tea Company, a grocery retailer, ticker symbol GAP

Science and technology
 Band gap or "energy gap", the energy interval in which particles cannot propagate
 Gallium(III) phosphide, a semiconductor material
 Glyceraldehyde 3-phosphate, a 3-carbon molecule metabolite important in both glycolysis and the Calvin cycle
 Good agricultural practice, any collection of value-based agricultural practices
 GTPase-activating proteins, a family of regulatory proteins

Linguistics
 Gap, accidental gap, or lexical gap, a word or other form that does not exist in a language but could
 Gap, a kind of ellipsis, e.g.:
 Gap is an instance of gapping
 Parasitic gap, a kind of correlated ellipsis

Mathematics and computer science and technology
 Air gap (networking), a security measure
 GAP (computer algebra system) (Groups, Algorithms and Programming), a software package
 Generalized assignment problem
 Generic access profile, an interoperability protocol used in wireless telephony
 Gimp Animation Package, an extension for the GIMP
 Graph automorphism problem

Other uses
 Gap (chart pattern), areas where no trading occurs in the stock market
 Gap (Mandaeism) or Gaf, a demon of the Mandaean underworld
 GAP insurance, a type of vehicle insurance
 Gap Mangione, or Gaspare Charles "Gap" Mangione, jazz pianist and bandleader
 Gap year, a prolonged period between life stages
 .45 GAP, the "Glock Automatic Pistol" cartridge

See also
 Gap theorem (disambiguation)
 Gaps (disambiguation)
 The Gap (disambiguation)